Chertikha is a rural locality (a village) in Ustretskoye Rural Settlement, Syamzhensky District, Vologda Oblast, Russia. The population was 13 as of 2002.

Geography 
Chertikha is located 15 km northwest of Syamzha (the district's administrative centre) by road. Shoksha is the nearest rural locality.

References 

Rural localities in Syamzhensky District